The 1st Globes de Cristal Award ceremony honoured the best French movies, actors, actresses, plays, concerts, novels, singers, TV series, exhibitions and fashion designers of 2005 and took place on 13 March 2006 at the Luxembourg Palace in Paris. The ceremony was chaired and hosted by Patrick Poivre d'Arvor.

Winners and nominees
The winners are denoted in bold.

Cinema

The Beat That My Heart Skipped - Jacques Audiard
Russian Dolls - Cédric Klapisch
Joyeux Noël - Christian Carion
The Young Lieutenant - Xavier Beauvois
Live and Become - Radu Mihăileanu

Romain Duris - The Beat That My Heart Skipped
Michel Bouquet - The Last Mitterrand
Clovis Cornillac - Le cactus
Benoît Poelvoorde - Entre ses mains
José Garcia - The Axe

Nathalie Baye - The Young Lieutenant
Marion Cotillard - Love Is in the Air
Elsa Zylberstein - Little Jerusalem
Catherine Frot - Boudu
Isabelle Carré - Entre ses mains

Television

Kaamelott - Alexandre Astier & Alain Kappauf
Dans la tête du tueur - Claude-Michel Rome
Clara Sheller - Nicolas Mercier
Dolmen - Didier Albert
Les Rois maudits - Josée Dayan

Ushuaia - Nicolas Hulot

Theater

Love Letters - Sandrine Dumas

Bartabas - Battuta

Gad Elmaleh - La Vie Normale

Literature

Dictionnaire égoïste de la littérature française - Charles Dantzig

Histoires inédites du Petit Nicolas - René Goscinny & Jean-Jacques Sempé

Music

Camille - Le Fil

Alain Souchon - La Vie Théodore

Others

Raymond Depardon

Jean Nouvel

Florence Doléac

Jean-Paul Gaultier

See also
 31st César Awards

References

External links
 Official website
  

Cesar
2006 film awards
Globes de Cristal Awards